Barbara Lou "Barb" (née Gilb) Vickerman (October 26, 1933 – December 22, 1997) was an American businesswoman and politician.

Born in Tracy, Minnesota, Vickerman went to vocational school and was a medical laboratory technician. Vickerman owned a card and gift shop; she and her husband owned a bowling alley in Redwood Falls, Minnesota. Vickerman served in the Minnesota House of Representatives, as a Republican, from 1993 until her death in 1997. Vickerman died in Redwood Falls, Minnesota of cancer. Her cousin-in-law Jim Vickerman also served in the Minnesota Legislature.

References

External links

1933 births
1997 deaths
People from Tracy, Minnesota
Republican Party members of the Minnesota House of Representatives
Women state legislators in Minnesota
People from Redwood Falls, Minnesota
Businesspeople from Minnesota
20th-century American businesspeople
Deaths from cancer in Minnesota
20th-century American politicians
20th-century American women politicians